Starotyryshkino is a rural locality (a selo) in Anuysky Selsoviet, Smolensky District, Altai Krai, Russia. The population was 247 as of 2013. There are 8 streets.

Geography 
Starotyryshkino is located 23 km northwest of Smolenskoye (the district's administrative centre) by road. Ust-Anuy is the nearest rural locality.

References 

Rural localities in Smolensky District, Altai Krai